The University of the West Indies at St. Augustine is a public research university in St. Augustine, Trinidad and Tobago. It is one of 5 general campuses in the University of the West Indies system, which are ranked 1st in the Caribbean. It is ranked 1st in Trinidad and Tobago and 28th best in Latin America.

Although St. Augustine is the main campus in Trinidad and Tobago, there is also a satellite campus of UWI St. Augustine in nearby Mount Hope (within the Eric Williams Medical Sciences Complex) that houses the Faculty of Medical Sciences of the University. UWI St. Augustine, which began in 1960, was borne out of the Imperial College of Tropical Agriculture. It is the only member university of the system that boasts a Faculty of Food and Agriculture, an area of expertise that has long been interwoven into the history of the Caribbean islands.

The University confers degrees from bachelor to doctoral levels.

The University offers student exchange programmes to colleges around the world such as McGill University, University of Toronto, Concordia University, Queen's University, University of St. Andrews, University of Freiburg, Bordeaux Montaigne University, École supérieure de commerce et management, Middlesex University, University of Wisconsin Madison, Stockholm University to name a few and others.

Notable alumni 

Funso Aiyejina
Kevin Jared Hosein
Faris Al-Rawi
Keith Rowley
Shakuntala Haraksingh Thilsted
Roshan Parasram
Patricia Bishop
Jehue Gordon
Jack Warner (football executive)
Gordon Shirley
Garvin Medera, CEO of Caribbean Airlines
Edwin Carrington
Khalid Hassanali, Former President of Petrotrin
Trevon Joseph
Charles Eugene Percy

Notable faculty  

Courtenay Bartholomew
Rose-Marie Belle Antoine
Grace Jackson
Joan Latchman
Earl Lovelace
George Maxwell Richards
David Nicholls (theologian)
Angelique Nixon
Kenneth Ramchand
Richard Robertson
Gordon Rohlehr
Hazel Simmons-McDonald
John Spence (scientist)
Marjorie Thorpe
Elizabeth Walcott-Hackshaw

References 

Universities in Trinidad and Tobago
University of the West Indies